Alphonse Mingana (born as Hurmiz Mingana; , in 1878 at Sharanesh, a village near Zakho (present day Iraq) - died 5 December 1937 Birmingham, England) was an Assyrian theologian, historian, Syriacist, orientalist and a former priest who is best known for collecting and preserving the Mingana Collection of ancient Middle Eastern manuscripts at Birmingham. Like the majority of Assyrians in the Zakho region, his family belonged to the Chaldean Catholic Church. Alphonse was born to Paolus and Maryam Nano, and had seven siblings.

Arrival in England
In 1913 Mingana came to England at the invitation of J. Rendel Harris, Director of Studies at Woodbrooke Quaker Study Centre, a Quaker Settlement at Selly Oak in Birmingham. Mingana remained at Woodbrooke for two years where he met his future wife, Emma Sophie Floor, a Norwegian student. The couple were married in 1915. In the same year Mingana was appointed to the staff of the John Rylands Library in Manchester to catalogue the Library's collection of Arabic manuscripts. He lived in Manchester until 1932 during which time his two children, John and Marie, were born.  By the time Mingana left John Rylands in 1932 he had risen to the post of Keeper of the Oriental Manuscripts.

The Mingana Collection

In 1924 Mingana made the first of three trips to the Middle East to collect ancient Syriac and Arabic manuscripts. The expedition was sponsored by John Rylands Library and Dr Edward Cadbury, the Quaker owner of the famous chocolate factory at Bournville, who Mingana had met through Rendel Harris. A number of the manuscripts he returned with formed the basis of the Mingana Collection at Woodbrooke.  Mingana added to the collection with manuscripts acquired on two further trips to the Middle East in 1925 and 1929, both trips were financed solely by Edward Cadbury.  In 1932 Mingana moved back to Birmingham to focus on cataloging the collection.  The first catalogue describing 606 Syriac manuscripts was published in 1933. A further volume published in 1936 describes 120 Christian Arabic manuscripts and 16 Syriac manuscripts.  The third volume, cataloging 152 Christian Arabic manuscripts and 40 Syriac manuscripts was published in 1939, two years after Mingana's death.

The Mingana Collection is housed at Special Collections at the University of Birmingham where it is available for study.  The collection is designated by the Museums, Libraries and Archives Council as being of international importance.

Papers of Alphonse Mingana, including his correspondence, notebooks, reports and other items, are also held at the Cadbury Research Library (reference number DA66).

Selected publications 
Catalogue
1934: Catalogue of the Arabic Manuscripts in the John Rylands Library, Manchester. 1192 p. Manchester: Manchester University Press

References and sources
References

Sources
 
Coakley, J. F. (1993) A Catalogue of the Syriac Manuscripts in the John Rylands Library, Bulletin of the John Rylands University Library of Manchester, Vol. 75, No. 2, Summer 1993.
Hunt, Lucy-Anne (1997) The Mingana and Related Collections Birmingham: Edward Cadbury Charitable Trust
Margoliouth, D. S. & Woledge, G. (1939) A. Mingana: a Biography and Bibliography. Birmingham: Selly Oak Colleges

External links

'Oldest' Koran fragments found in Birmingham University - 22 July 2015
Biography at the University of Birmingham website
Mingana Collection at the Virtual Manuscript Room  71 digitized manuscripts from the Mingana Collection. 
University of Birmingham Special Collections How to visit and access the Mingana Collection 
Illuminating Faith Exhibition of manuscripts from the Mingana Collection
Islamic-Awareness, From Alphonse Mingana to Christoph Luxenberg: "Arabic Script & the Alleged Syriac Origins of the Qur'an"

1878 births
1937 deaths
People from Dohuk Province
People of Iraqi-Assyrian descent
Chaldean Catholics
British orientalists
British people of Iraqi descent
Emigrants from the Ottoman Empire to the United Kingdom
Assyrian Iraqi writers
British historians of Islam
British people of Assyrian descent
Syriacists
Syriac writers
John Rylands Research Institute and Library